The acronym BATC may refer to:

 Best Available Technology Conclusions, used in e.g. EU IED enforcement
 British Amateur Television Club
 BIAC, (formerly the) Brussels Airport Terminal Company
 BATC (Ball Aerospace and Technology Corp.) Broomfield and Boulder, Co.
 Bridgerland Technical College (formerly known as Bridgerland Applied Technology College)